Release Me is the eleventh studio album by Lyle Lovett, released in 2012 through the record label Lost Highway Records.

Track listing
 "Garfield's Blackberry Blossom" – 3:06
 "Release Me" (with k.d. lang) – 2:45
 "White Boy Lost in the Blues" – 3:32
 "Baby, It's Cold Outside" (with Kat Edmonson) – 3:17
 "Isn't That So" – 4:50
 "Understand You" – 3:43
 "Brown Eyed Handsome Man" – 3:36
 "Keep It Clean" – 2:36
 "One Way Gal" – 2:59
 "Dress of Laces" (with Sara Watkins) – 6:13
 "The Girl with the Holiday Smile" – 3:57
 "Night's Lullaby" (with Sara Watkins and Sean Watkins) – 3:25
 "White Freightliner Blues" – 5:06
 "Keep Us Steadfast" – 2:45

Chart performance

References

2012 albums
Lyle Lovett albums
Lost Highway Records albums